William H. Kerdyk Jr. is an American entrepreneur, politician, international golf tournament organizer and real estate investor.

Early life 

Kerdyk was born in Doctor’s Hospital in Coral Gables, Florida to William Kerdyk Sr. and Marlene Schulte Kerdyk. His father, Bill Sr. was raised in Gloversville, New York, the son of a direct immigrant from the Netherlands. His mother, Marlene was the child of German immigrants, from Mankato, Minnesota. Kerdyk was raised in Coral Gables, graduated from Coral Gables Senior High School and earned a Bachelor’s in Business Administration and Real Estate from Florida International University. In 1985, Kerdyk joined the family-owned business, Kerdyk Real Estate. He purchased the business from his uncle in 1993.

Business career

Kerdyk Real Estate 

Kerdyk is President and CEO of Kerdyk Real Estate, a full service real estate brokerage company headquartered in Coral Gables, Florida. In addition to its residential and commercial division, the company also focuses on its management portfolio and the disposition of REO and distressed properties through its Division of Bankruptcies and Foreclosures. Kerdyk is also president of Kerdyk Referral Services for licensed real estate agents.

Kerdyk is an active real estate investor in Miami and South Florida. His real estate portfolio features properties in the retail, office, warehouse and residential asset classes.

Kerdyk Real Estate is involved with several professional and service organizations:

 The Beacon Council
 Big Brothers Big Sisters of America
 Coral Gables Chamber of Commerce
 Gulliver Schools Academy Board of Trustees
 Miami Association of Realtors
 Realtors Commercial Alliance
 Rotary Club of Coral Gables/Rotary International
 Super Bowl Host Committee
 Past National Delegate, National Association of Realtors

First American Bank/Bank of Coral Gables 
Kerdyk was the founder and served as Chairman of the Board of Directors of the Bank of Coral Gables, a community bank that he and a group of investors founded in 2006 with $20 million in capital. In December 2014, First American Bank, a full service bank with 60 branches located in 3 states and headquartered in Elk Grove Village, IL with assets of $6 billion, received regulatory approval to merge with the Bank of Coral Gables, located in Coral Gables, Florida. Kerdyk led the merger negotiations and has joined the Board of Directors of First American Bank.

Toyota Junior Golf World Cup 

Kerdyk, an avid golfer, founded the Toyota Junior World Cup with Japanese business partners Yasmasa Tagashira and Eiji Tagashira in 1992. This junior golf tournament was formed to allow the finest junior golfers in the world the opportunity to compete in an international team event.

More than 70 countries participate in qualifying tournaments held throughout the year in North and South America, Asia, Europe, Oceania and Africa. The winners and second-place finishers in the qualifying tournaments are invited to participate in the finals held in Japan. Toyota and Japan Airlines are the major sponsors of the tournament.

Some notable junior golfers who have participated in previous tournaments and later gained prominence include current Official World Golf Ranking number 1 player Scottie Scheffler, 2022 British Open winner Cameron Smith, Japanese professional golfer and 2021 Masters Tournament Champion Hideki Matsuyama, Spanish professional golfer and 2021 US Open Champion Jon Rahm, 2016 British Open Champion and 2016 Olympic Silver Medalist Sweden's Henrik Stenson, 2013 US Open Champion and 2016 Olympic Gold Medalist England's Justin Rose, 2016 Masters Tournament Champion Danny Willet,  2011 Masters Tournament Champion Charles Schwartzel, 2010 British Open Champion Louis Oosthuizen and 2008 Masters Tournament Champion Trevor Immelman.
The tournament qualifying system is modeled after the World Cup soccer tournament, where regional tournaments are held to allow countries to qualify and play.
Kerdyk also chaired the Junior Orange Bowl Golf Tournament in Miami for several years, one of the premier invitational amateur golf tournaments in the world.

In 2014, the championship announced a girl’s event as part of the tournament.

Political career 

After serving for 20 years, Kerdyk stepped down from public office in April 2015 and the City of Coral Gables bestowed the title Vice Mayor Emeritus upon him in recognition of his many years of service. He served as a Coral Gables Commissioner on a citywide, nonpartisan basis starting in 1995 and was subsequently re-elected in 1999, 2003, 2007 and 2011. He served as Vice Mayor in 1999, 2001 and from 2007 to 2015.
In April 2015, in recognition of his longstanding career as a public servant, the 3.5 acre Riviera Park, located at 6611 Yumuri Street in Coral Gables, was renamed ‘William H. Kerdyk, Jr. Family Park’.
At a Coral Gables City Commission meeting held in April 2015, the following video commemorating the Kerdyk legacy was broadcast:

Stands 

Kerdyk had four major stands as a Coral Gables Commissioner, which include support for strong zoning codes, fiscal conservation, strong advocacy for ‘best in class’ city services and quality of life issues for residents

Programs 

Throughout his political career, Kerdyk has initiated several city programs:
 Coral Gables Trolleys:  A free intra-city transportation connector system that serves over 1.25 million riders annually and has enhanced overall mass transit throughout the community.
 Parknership Program:  A public/private partnership to purchase and enhance open spaces throughout the City of Coral Gables. $2 million in private funding has been raised to date.
 Downtown Landscape Plan:  he orchestrated an ordinance that required landscaping for all new developments in the community areas of Coral Gables. The purpose of the plan is to increase tree canopy, improve natural beauty of the area and create a pedestrian friendly environment.
 Ponce de Leon Boulevard Median: Initiated and assisted in securing funding for a landscaped median on Ponce de Leon Boulevard in the heart of Coral Gables that has improved traffic flow and enhanced the boulevard.
 Traffic Calming:  Proposed and initiated traffic calming measures throughout Coral Gables residential areas.

Political Organizations 

Kerdyk has served on numerous political organizations affecting Miami-Dade County and the State of Florida:

 Public Service Commission Nominating Council: Nominated by Senator Marco Rubio and appointed by the State of Florida to serve on nine-member council.
 Metropolitan Planning Organization: Appointed by Governor Jeb Bush to serve on panel responsible for Miami-Dade County's transportation planning process.
 Mayor’s Blue Ribbon Panel: Appointed by Miami-Dade County Mayor Alex Penelas to negotiate the relocation of Cunard Cruise Lines to Miami-Dade County.
 Miami-Dade County Charter Review Task Force: Appointed by Miami-Dade County Mayor Carlos A. Gimenez.

Personal life 

Kerdyk and his wife, Lynn, a clinical child psychologist at the University of Miami, have three children – William H. Kerdyk, III, Lindsay Kerdyk and Leigh Mason Kerdyk.

Philanthropy 

In July of 2022, Bill Kerdyk, Jr., and his wife Lynn, initiated and invited the leadership of the Coral Gables Garden Club regarding funding for the Camp Mahachee project restoration, a treasured camp of the Girl Scouts of Tropical Florida, on Old Cutler Road in Coral Gables. The $85,000 in cash and in kind donations raised to date will increase when the PARKnership Fund launches a community-wide fundraising campaign to support Phases two and three of the project. The seed funders for this project include Bill Kerdyk, Jr. and his wife Lynn; the Coral Gables Garden Club; and the Coral Gables Community Foundation.

In September 2018, Kerdyk along with sisters Tracy Kerdyk and Kim Kerdyk, donated $75,000 to the Coral Gables Garden Club in memory of their mother, Marlene Schulte Kerdyk. The donation will be held in the Marlene Kerdyk Beautification Fund established at the Coral Gables Community Foundation. Its purpose is to support landscape beautification projects in the City of Coral Gables and improve the quality of life for its residents.  

Kerdyk founded the Kerdyk Family Music Scholarship Fund in October 2002 in memory of his father, William H. Kerdyk Sr., who shared his love of music with his own children and grandchildren. A financial scholarship is given annually to a graduating senior that lives in Coral Gables who has shown an interest in music during high school. To date, more than $60,000 has been awarded to deserving music students.

 Board of Directors, Big Brothers/Big Sisters of America
 Board of Trustees, Gulliver Schools
 Graduate, Leadership Florida	
 Graduate, Leadership Miami 
 Host Committee, Miami-Dade County Super Bowl	
 Board of Directors, Bach Society 
 Member, Rotary Club of Coral Gables	
 Member, Orange Bowl Committee

Awards and honors

South Florida Business & Wealth Magazine 2020 Apogee Award in the Real Estate category. This recognizes distinguished C-level leaders in Miami-Dade, Broward and Palm Beach counties whose dedication to their industries and communities deserves particular recognition
Florida Trend Magazine’s Florida 500 - selected for inclusion in the inaugural edition that highlights the 500 most influential business leaders in Florida, September 2022, 2021, 2020, 2019 and 2018
On June 25, 2015, Kerdyk received the George E. Merrick Award from the Coral Gables Chamber of Commerce, bestowed on a leader and visionary in Coral Gables, in memory of George E. Merrick, the father and founder of Coral Gables.
 Rotary Club of Coral Gables Citizen of the Year, May 2015
 Coral Gables Chamber of Commerce, Green Legacy Award in recognition of the City of Coral Gables Parknership program, April 2015
 Legacy honoree at the first Annual Junior Orange Bowl Gala in Coral Gables recognized for tireless and selfless work and Impact on youth through philanthropic endeavors, February 2015
 Coral Gables Foundation Legacy Award
 Designated among Outstanding Young Men of America
 Recipient, Ronald McDonald House Twelve Good Men of South Florida Award Member
 Selected Who's Who of America (for achievements and contributions)
Chamber gives Merrick Award to William H. 'Bill' Kerdyk Jr.
Friends and Neighbors: Reagan/Doral High murals honor two killed in car accidents

References

External links 
  Coral Gables legend steps down; commission talks trolleys and building development
  Seven-decade tradition ends in Gables; commissioner Bill Kerdyk terms out
 Susan Danseyar, Miami Today, “Coral Gables Creates First American Tie”, December 18, 2014
  The Bank of Coral Gables completes sale to First American Bank
  Official website for Kerdyk Real Estate
  Official website of the Toyota Junior Golf World Cup
  First American Bank
  Kerdyk continues to serve city even out of office June 2015
  Guru of the Gables
[10] Miami Herald Business Monday investor profile November 23, 2020
[11] The Real Deal - 147 Alhambra sale (investor) October 6, 2020
[12] Miami Herald – First American Bank new office building on Bird Road June 9, 2020 
[13] Miami Herald 2619 Ponce de Leon Blvd purchase (investor) March 10, 2020
[14] [15] [16] Miami Herald 65 Miracle Mile/Roman Jones August 2019
[17] The Miami Herald – Prosperous Chapter for Miracle Mile? Rebecca San Juan December 12, 2021
[18] Coral Gables Magazine – Convenience 2.0 (GoPuff Targets Coral Gables) September 2021
[19] The Real Deal – Miami Lease roundup: GoPuff to open retail storefront in Coral Gables June 28, 2021

Year of birth missing (living people)
Living people
People from Coral Gables, Florida
Florida International University alumni
American people of Dutch descent
American people of German descent